Rupela horridula is a moth in the family Crambidae. It was described by Carl Heinrich in 1937. It is found in Brazil (Rio de Janeiro), the Guianas and Trinidad.

The wingspan is 22–32 mm. The wings are white.

References

Moths described in 1937
Schoenobiinae
Taxa named by Carl Heinrich